Chapin may refer to:

Places

United States 
Chapin, Idaho, an unincorporated community
Chapin, Illinois, a village
Chapin, Iowa, an unincorporated community
Chapin Township, Michigan
Chapin, Missouri, an unincorporated community
Chapin, New York
Chapin, South Carolina, a town
Edinburg, Texas or Chapin
Chapin, Wisconsin, an unincorporated community

Elsewhere 
Chapni or Chapin, Armenia
Chapin Peak, Wilkes Land, Antarctica

People
Chapin (surname)
Chapin (given name)
Chapin, regional demonym for people from Guatemala

Schools
Chapin School, a school in New York
Chapin School (New Jersey)
Chapin High School, a public high school in South Carolina
Captain John L. Chapin High School, a public high school in Texas

Other uses
Chapin Block, Southbridge, Massachusetts, on the US National Register of Historic Places
Chapin National Bank Building, Springfield, Massachusetts, on the US National Register of Historic Places
Chapin Memorial Church, Oneonta, New York, on the US National Register of Historic Places
Mount Chapin, a summit in Colorado

See also
Chapin Sisters, a US female singing group